Bloomer Township may refer to:
 Bloomer Township, Michigan
 Bloomer Township, Minnesota

Township name disambiguation pages